The 1995 Tonga rugby union tour of Japan was a series of matches played in February 1995 in Japan by Tonga national rugby union team, to prepare the 1995 Rugby World Cup

Results 
Scores and results list Tonga's points tally first.

References 

1995 rugby union tours
1995
1995 in Oceanian rugby union
1995 in Asian rugby union
1995 in Japanese sport
February 1995 sports events in Asia
1995